Dame Billie Antoinette Miller, DA, OOC (born 8 January 1944) is a Barbadian politician who served as Deputy Prime Minister.  Miller is a member of the Barbados Labour Party (BLP).

Early life and education 
Billie Miller's father, the late Frederick Edward Miller, was himself a parliamentarian of distinction, holding the Ministerial portfolios of Health and Social Services from 1956 to 1961, while her mother Mildred Miriam (née Lashley) was a nurse.

Miller was educated at Queen's College in Barbados, King's College, Durham University, and the Council of Legal Education in England.

Career and politics 
She was called to the Bar of England and Wales in 1968 and to the Bar of Barbados in 1969, becoming the island's first woman barrister. She was a practising attorney from 1969 to 1976 and 1987–1994. She was appointed Deputy Prime Minister and Minister of Foreign Affairs in 1994 within the government of Prime Minister Owen Arthur, and was also charged with the responsibility of Leader of the House of Assembly and MP for the constituency of the City of Bridgetown. She later gave up that post during a cabinet reshuffle after the 2003 elections, in which the BLP maintained power. In 1999 she has also headed the Ministry of Foreign Trade.

Miller began her political career in 1976 when she was elected Member of Parliament for the City of Bridgetown in a by-election. A few months later, she fought and won her seat again in the General Elections. She served as Minister of Health and National Insurance from 1976 to 1981 and was the first female to sit in the Cabinet of Barbados. Re-elected to Parliament in 1981, she was appointed Minister of Education with the Culture portfolio being added in 1985.

Following the 1986 General Elections when the Barbados Labour Party lost at the polls, she was appointed to the Senate where she served as Leader of Opposition Business. She was again elected Member for the City of Bridgetown in the General Elections of 1991, and served as Deputy Leader of the Opposition from 1993 to 1994. In September 1994, when the Barbados Labour Party was returned to government, Miller was re-elected as the member for the City of Bridgetown for the fourth time.

Roles and responsibilities 
Very active in the civic and non-governmental arena, she has been Chairperson (the first woman) of the Executive of the Commonwealth Parliamentary Association, and of the Inter-American Development Bank’s Women in Development Unit; President of the International Planned Parenthood Federation/Western Hemisphere Region; Vice–President of the Inter-American Parliamentary Group on Population and Development and President of the African, Caribbean and Pacific States Council of Ministers. She was also a member of the International Planned Parenthood Federation/Central Council and the UN Population Fund’s Advisory Panel of Activities Concerning Women.

Miller served as Chairperson of the NGO Planning Committee of the International Conference on Population and Development held in Cairo, in Egypt in 1994. She has also served as Secretary-Treasurer of the Barbados Bar Association; Legal Adviser to Women in Action; and as a member of the Board of Directors of Life of Barbados Ltd; the Planned Parenthood Federation of America Inc.; Inter-American Dialogue; and on the Board of Trustees Of International Commentary Service.

She was a member of both the International Federation of Women Lawyers from 1975–1976 and the Commonwealth Human Rights Initiative’s Advisor Group during 1990–1992.

She was the Chairperson of the Association of Caribbean States’ Ministerial Council; President of the Board of Directors of the Inter-American Parliamentary Group on Population and Development for the Caribbean and Latin-America; Chairperson of the Inter-American Development Bank’s Advisory Council on Women in Development; and vice-chairperson of the Commonwealth Ministerial Action Group.

Awards 
Ms Miller was awarded the Queen's Silver Jubilee Medal in 1977.

She was appointed Grand Officer of the National Order of Benin on 23 June 2000, for her contribution to the negotiations that led to the new Partnership Agreement between Europe and the African, Caribbean and Pacific Group of States. She is also a member of Washington D.C. based think tank the Inter-American Dialogue.

She is also the recipient of the Barbados Centennial Award 2000, when Miller was conferred the highest honour in Barbados; she was also made a Dame of St. Andrew (DA) of the Order of Barbados in 2003.

On 26 June 2001, she was awarded as Grand Cross of the National Order of Juan Mora Fernandez by the Government of Costa Rica.

Her recreational activities include reading, interior design and Ikebana (the Japanese art of flower arranging).

It was widely believed that Miller would eventually succeed Owen Arthur as leader of the BLP, but Mottley succeeded Arthur as BLP leader in January 2008 after the party was voted out of power.

In 2022, she was awarded the Order of the Caribbean Community, the highest awarded that can be conferred on a Caribbean national.

Notes

References

See also 
List of the first women holders of political offices in North America

Further reading 
Biography and Profile of Billie Miller, Barbados Government
Biography of Billie Miller Bermuda Government
Still a buzzy Billie, Nation Newspaper
Biography of Billie Miller, National Women's Commission of Barbados.

 

1944 births
Living people
Alumni of King's College, Newcastle
Barbadian women diplomats
Deputy Prime Ministers of Barbados
Barbados Labour Party politicians
Culture ministers of Barbados
Education ministers of Barbados
Health ministers of Barbados
Trade ministers of Barbados
Female foreign ministers
Foreign Ministers of Barbados
Knights and Dames of St Andrew (Barbados)
Recipients of the Order of the Caribbean Community
Members of the Inter-American Dialogue
Members of the House of Assembly of Barbados
People from Bridgetown
Queen's College (Barbados) alumni
Women government ministers of Barbados